The Sweet Life may refer to:

La Dolce Vita, a 1960 film directed by Federico Fellini
The Sweet Life (album), a 1972 album by jazz organist Reuben Wilson
The Sweet Life (film), an American comedy-drama film starring Chris Messina
The Sweet Life (TV series), a daily lifestyle magazine program for women
The Suite Life of Zack & Cody, an American children's television series that airs on the Disney Channel

See also
 Sweet Life (disambiguation)